Barbara Jones (born January 6, 1977) is an American cross-country skier. She competed in three events at the 2002 Winter Olympics. Jones attended Saint Paul Central High School where she won three straight Minnesota State High School League championships in 1993, 1994, and 1995. She also placed second in the 1,600 meter and 3,200 meter races at the state track meet in 1994. The Star Tribune described her as the best high school level skier from the state until the emergence of Jessie Diggins. She graduated from Dartmouth College in 1999.

Cross-country skiing results
All results are sourced from the International Ski Federation (FIS).

Olympic Games

World Cup

Season standings

References

External links
 

1977 births
Living people
American female cross-country skiers
Olympic cross-country skiers of the United States
Cross-country skiers at the 2002 Winter Olympics
People from Stillwater, Minnesota
21st-century American women